Mannville may refer to:

Mannville, Alberta, a town in Alberta, Canada
Mannville Group, a stratigraphical unit in the Western Canadian Sedimentary Basin

See also
Manville (disambiguation)